Philimon Chipeta (born 2 February 1981), sometimes spelled Philimon Chepita is a Zambian football striker who is currently unattached.

Formerly he played for PKNS FC in the 2012 Malaysia Super League on short-term contract to replace Michaël Niçoise who is out through injury. He played 4 times for the club, scoring no goals.

Chepita previous stint in Malaysia was with Perlis FA, where he helped them win Malaysia Cup in 2004 and 2006, and also 2005 Super League Malaysia title. In his first season with Perlis, he also claimed the top goalscorer title with 23 goals.

He also played in Indonesia, Syria as well as his native Zambia.

He was part of the Zambian African Nations Cup teams in 2002.

References

External links

Expatriate footballers in Indonesia
Expatriate footballers in Malaysia
1981 births
Living people
Zambian footballers
Zambia international footballers
Zambian expatriate footballers
Zambian expatriate sportspeople in Malaysia
Expatriate footballers in Syria
Perlis FA players
PKNS F.C. players
Lusaka Dynamos F.C. players
Persib Bandung players
Association football forwards
Syrian Premier League players